Kinoy is a surname. Notable people with the surname include:
 Arthur Kinoy (1920–2003), American attorney
 Ernest Kinoy (1925–2014), American writer
 Peter Kinoy, American documentary filmmaker